Noor Muhammad Maharvi (born 2 April 1746, died 3 August 1793) was a Sufi saint of Chishti Order in Chishtian, Punjab, Pakistan.

Early life

Maharvi was born in 1746 at Chhotala near Bahawalnagar of the Sikh Empire. He was a Muslim Panwar Kharal, many native tribes in Punjab region and Sindh became Muslim due to his teachings. The dargah of Maharvi is located in Chishtian, Pakistan.

Life and Teachings

Maharvi received his spiritual initiation in the Chishti Order at the hands of Molana Fakhruddin Jehan Dehlvi of Dehli. He was designated his successor and later returned to Punjab, where he propagated and disseminated the religious traditions associated with Chishti mysticism. Maharvi was known to travel to the shrine of Fariduddin Ganjshakar at Pakpattan every Friday for Jum'ah prayers, he was15th khalifa of baba farid and tradition records that he would make the journey by foot. To his followers he was venerated by the honorific title 'Qibla Alam', signifying an elevated spiritual status within the Islamic mystical tradition.

References

External links
 A Glossary of the Tribes and Castes of the Punjab and North-West ..., Volume 1

1746 births
1793 deaths
Punjabi Sufi saints
People from Bahawalnagar District
Punjabi people
Sufi mystics
Sufi poets
Mystic poets
Chishti Order
Burials in India
Indian Sufi saints